Functional analogs (or functional analogues) are entities (models, representations, etc.) that can be replaced, to fulfill the same function.  When the entities in question are formally represented by black boxes, the concept of analog is related to "same behavior": they take the same output sequence when submitted to the same input sequence.

Systems engineering

Analogical models are used in a method of representing a ‘target system’ by another, more understandable or analysable system. Two systems have "analog functions" (see illustration) if the black box representation of both can be the same.

electronics